WGRD-FM (97.9 MHz) is a mainstream rock radio station in Grand Rapids, Michigan. The station is owned by Townsquare Media. It is the flagship station of The Free Beer and Hot Wings Show, a comedy/talk program, on weekday mornings. It consists of five members: Gregg "Free Beer" Daniels, Chris "Hot Wings" Michels, Steve McKiernan and Kelly Cheesborough. The show is now syndicated in 38 markets throughout the United States.

Rock 40/Top 40/CHR Era
97.9 FM began in 1962 as WXTO, a station owned by the Roman Catholic Diocese of Grand Rapids and operated by Aquinas College; later, the owners of Top 40 music stations WGRD/1410 in Grand Rapids and WTRU/1600 Muskegon (Regional Broadcasters, Inc.) took full control of the station in 1971 and changed its call letters to WGRD-FM. The station's transmitter would remain on the Aquinas College campus until 1974.

In 1971, WGRD/1410, a daytime-only station (hence the call letters, which stood for "Grand Rapids Daytime") which had had a Top 40 music format in place since 1959, was struggling in the ratings against pop-rock competitors WLAV/1340 and WZZM-FM/95.7 (then known as "Z96", now WLHT-FM).  WGRD thus moved its struggling Top 40 format onto its new FM station as "The New 98 Rock, WGRD FM", making the stereo FM station the primary frequency while having the AM continue to simulcast. The newly revamped WGRD quickly became the dominant Top 40 station in the market and continued to be for over two decades.

During the mid-1970s, WGRD was frequently the #1 station (12+) in the Grand Rapids market. In the 1979 Fall Arbitron ratings period, WGRD dominated the market with a 19 share. By 1985, the station was known as "98 Rock, WGRD" has earned a 12.2 share (12+) in the Summer 1986 Arbitron ratings with 98 Rock Morning Show hosted by Johnny "Big John" Howell, Robert "Radar" Shroll, and Jennifer Stephens.

CHR to Alternative to Active Rock
By the summer of 1994 the station moniker was "Grand Rapids #1 Hit Music Station! 98 WGRD" and they were still trying to refine their Top 40 format while there was increasing competition from other area radio stations.

By 1995 however the station had lost significant market share to Muskegon's WSNX which had flipped from AC to CHR. WSNX was programmed by former WGRD music director J.J. Duling and began to eclipse WGRD in the area radio ratings.

During 1995, WGRD began phasing in popular alternative rock and Modern AC music into the playlist. Over a several month period, the CHR product was subsequently phased out and the station began promoting themselves as an alternative rock station.

In August 2010 a reunion of more than 60 former WGRD staff members was held in Grand Rapids which included market legend Bruce Grant, the original program director from 1948, and dozens of other personalities from the AM 1410/FM 97.9 history.

During 2010, WGRD began to shift from alternative rock to active rock. This was due to a format hole in the market being created by longtime Rock/CHR and active rock station WKLQ leaving the format for sports talk.

WGRD's target demographic is men ages 18–34 and a secondary of Men 25-54 (Arbitron demographics).

Sources 
WGRD Website
Michiguide.com - WGRD-FM History

References

External links
WGRD Website

GRD-FM
GRD-FM
Active rock radio stations in the United States
Radio stations established in 1962
Townsquare Media radio stations